Rodolfo Certeza Severino Jr. (27 April 1936 – 19 April 2019) was a Filipino diplomat who served as the tenth secretary-general of ASEAN between 1998 and 2002.

Career 
He was the inaugural head of the ASEAN Studies Centre (ASC) at the ISEAS-Yusof Ishak Institute in Singapore from 2008 to 2015, and was an adjunct professor at the Lee Kuan Yew School of Public Policy, National University of Singapore until 2015. He was an Associate Senior Fellow affiliated with the ASC at the ISEAS-Yusof Ishak Institute. He is the author of four books: Southeast Asia in Search of an ASEAN Community (2006), ASEAN (2008), The ASEAN Regional Forum (2009) and Where in the World is the Philippines? (2010). He is also the co-editor of Whither the Philippines in the 21st Century? (2007), among other collections.

He studied at Ateneo de Manila University and held a post-graduate degree in international studies from the Johns Hopkins School of Advanced International Studies.

He previously held the following positions
Third, Second, and First Secretary, Philippine Embassy in Washington, D.C. (1967–1974)
Special Assistant to the Undersecretary of Foreign Affairs, Foreign Affairs  (1974–1976)
Minister-Counsellor and Chargé d'Affaires, Philippine Embassy in Beijing (1976–1979)
Consul General, Philippine Consulate General in Houston, Texas (1979–1986)
Assistant Secretary for Asian and Pacific Affairs and ASEAN Senior Official of the Philippines(1986–1988)
Ambassador Extraordinary and Plenipotentiary to Malaysia (1989–1992)
Undersecretary of Foreign Affairs and ASEAN Senior Official of the Philippines (1992–1997)
Professor, Asian Institute of Management, Manila, the Philippines (2003–2004)
Visiting Research Fellow, ISEAS, Singapore, Singapore (2005–2008)

Severino died of complications from Parkinson's disease on 19 April 2019, eight days before his 83rd birthday.

Awards 

1997 – Order of Sikatuna, rank of Datu, from President Fidel V. Ramos of the Philippines
2001 – Order of Sikatuna, rank of Rajah, from President Gloria Macapagal Arroyo of the Philippines, one of only two non-heads of state to receive the award in that rank
2002 – Commander of the Royal Order of Sahametrei, from King Norodom Sihanouk of Cambodia
2017 – Order of Lakandula, rank of Supremo, from President Rodrigo Duterte of the Philippines (posthumous)

References 

1936 births
2019 deaths
Filipino diplomats
Secretaries-General of ASEAN
Ateneo de Manila University alumni
Paul H. Nitze School of Advanced International Studies alumni

Commanders of the Royal Order of Sahametrei
Academic staff of the Asian Institute of Management
Neurological disease deaths in the Philippines
Deaths from Parkinson's disease
Burials at the Libingan ng mga Bayani
Grand Collars of the Order of Lakandula